Olga Foma (born 1 January 1989) is a Moldovan former footballer who played as a defender. She has been a member of the Moldova women's national team.

International career
Foma capped for Moldova at senior level during the 2007 FIFA Women's World Cup qualification (UEFA second category), including a 0–1 home loss to Israel on 11 May 2006.

References

1989 births
Living people
Women's association football defenders
Moldovan women's footballers
Moldova women's international footballers